Lake Matiri is a lake adjoining  Kahurangi National Park in the northwest corner of New Zealand's South Island.  The lake is part of the Matiri River.

Hydroelectric power scheme
Pioneer Energy Ltd purchased the Matiri Project from New Zealand Energy in 2014 and has now commenced construction of a hydroelectric power scheme on the lake outflow.

See also
List of lakes in New Zealand

External links
Department of Conservation - Matiri Valley & 1000 Acre Plateau tramping information

Matiri